Serratiopeptidase (Serratia E-15 protease, also known as serralysin, serrapeptase, serratiapeptase, serratia peptidase, serratio peptidase, or serrapeptidase) is a proteolytic enzyme (protease) produced by enterobacterium Serratia sp. E-15, now known as Serratia marcescens ATCC 21074.  This microorganism was originally isolated in the late 1960s from silkworm  (Bombyx mori L.) intestine.  Serratiopeptidase is present in the silkworm intestine and allows the emerging moth to dissolve its cocoon. Serratiopeptase is produced by purification from culture of Serratia E-15 bacteria. It is a member of the Peptidase M10B (Matrixin) family.

Health claims
Some alternative medicine proponents claim that serratiopeptidase is beneficial for pain and inflammation but "existing trials [have been] small and generally of poor methodological quality." Online medical journal Bandolier (specializing in evidence-based thinking about healthcare) published an article (in about 2001) in response to a reader's enquiry about serratiopeptidase.  After searching PubMed and the Cochrane Library "to see if there are any randomised, controlled trials", the article stated that the "evidence on serratiopeptidase being effective for anything is not based on a firm foundation of clinical trials."

The search found 34 publications in the medical databases covered that addressed the efficacy of serratiopeptidase, of which several were found to be animal experiments, personal letters, uncontrolled trials or those with inadequate or nonexistent randomisation. The article warned against ignoring safety issues with use of biological agents.  No studies were found to have been conducted on the efficacy of serratiopeptidase as treatment for back pain, heart attack, stroke, or asthma. Of the 10 medical conditions with randomized-evidence studies on file in connection with serratiopeptidase, the quality or construction of the trial studies was described as "generally poor".

See also 
 Proteases (medical and related uses)

References

External links 
 The MEROPS online database for peptidases and their inhibitors: M10.051

Biologically-based therapies
Proteases
EC 3.4.24